Democratic Confederation of Nepalese Trade Unions  (DECONT) was a central trade union organization in Nepal. DECONT is politically tied to the Nepali Congress (Democratic). The president of DECONT was Rajendra Bahadur Raut.

DECONT was formed after a split from the Nepal Trade Union Congress, the trade union wing of the Nepali Congress. DECONT was constituted on May 1, 1997. The DECONT-NTUC split predated the NC(D)-NC split. Thus the Sher Bahadur Deuba fraction inside NC had a separate trade union wing, before they had actually constituted a separate party.

In May 2005, DECONT joined the World Confederation of Labour (now the International Trade Union Confederation).

During the spring of 2006 DECONT took part in the protests against the regime of King Gyanendra.

On March 2, 2008, it merged with Nepal Trade Union Congress, forming the Nepal Trade Union Congress-Independent.

List of unions affiliated to DECONT
 Nepal Building Construction Worker's Union
 Nepal Emigration & Airport Employees Association
 Nepal Film Hall Workers' Union
 Nepal Carpet Workers' Union
 Nepal Painter, Plumber & Wiring Workers' Association
 Nepal Transport Workers' Association
 Nepal Garment Workers' Association
 Nepal Hotel Workers' Association
 Construction & Allied Workers' Union of Nepal
 Nepal Agricultural Worker's Association
 Nepal Barbers' Association

References

National trade union centers of Nepal
National federations of trade unions
International Trade Union Confederation
Trade unions established in 1997
Trade unions disestablished in 2008
1997 establishments in Nepal
2008 disestablishments in Nepal